France 3 Paris Île-de-France is a regional television service and part of the France 3 network. It is broadcast from its headquarters in Paris. It broadcasts to people in the Île-de-France region. Content is also produced in Paris.

Current presenters
Marlène Blin (19/20 news)
 Carla Carrasqueira (12/13 news)
 Jean-Noël Mirande (weekend news)
 Florent Carrière (Dimanche en politique)
 Vincent Ferniot (Ensemble c’est mieux !)
 Wendy Bouchard (Boulevard de la Seine)
 Yvan Hallouin (Paname)
 Bertrand Lambert (Parigo)

Other presenters
 Séverine Larrouy (replacing 12/13 news)
 Céline Cabral (replacing weekend news)
 Yannick Le Gall (« Avant le JT »)
Emmanuel Tixier (chronicler « Avant le JT »)
 William Van Qui (« 5 minutes pour convaincre »)

Current programming
 12/13
 19/20
 Parigo
 Dimanche en politique 
 Enquêtes de région 
 Paname 
 Boulevard de la Seine 
 Ensemble c’est mieux !
 La France en vrai

Former presenters
 Paul Wermus
 Marianne Théoleyre
 Sébastien Thomas 
 Élisabeth de Pourquery
 Pierre Lacombe
 Maud De Bohan
 Jean-Jacques Cros
 Laura Massis

Former programming
 13 minutes dimanche
 La Voix est libre
 Vues sur Loire
 Elysée Wermus
 Le Plus Grand Musée du Monde

See also 
 France 3 Centre

References

External links 
 Official site 

03 Paris Ile-de-France
Television channels and stations established in 1965
Mass media in Paris
1965 establishments in France